Kitley may refer to
Kitley Show Cave, solution cave in Devon, England
Elizabethtown-Kitley, Canadian township in Eastern Ontario

See also
Kiteley